George Greenfield (born May 5, 1948) is an American gymnast. He competed in eight events at the 1972 Summer Olympics.

References

1948 births
Living people
American male artistic gymnasts
Olympic gymnasts of the United States
Gymnasts at the 1972 Summer Olympics
People from Altadena, California